Alexander Semeonovitch Liberman (September 4, 1912 – November 19, 1999) was a Ukrainian-American magazine editor, publisher, painter, photographer, and sculptor. He held senior artistic positions during his 32 years at Condé Nast Publications.

Life and career
Liberman was born into a Jewish family in Kyiv. When his father took a post advising the Soviet government, the family moved to Moscow. Life there became difficult, and his father secured permission from Lenin and the Politburo to take his son to London in 1921.

Young Liberman was educated in  Ukraine, England, and France, where he took up life as a "White émigré" in Paris.

He began his publishing career in Paris in 1933–1936 with the early pictorial magazine Vu, where he worked under Lucien Vogel as art director, then managing editor, working with photographers such as Brassaï, André Kertész, and Robert Capa.

After emigrating to New York in 1941, he began working for Condé Nast Publications, rising to the position of editorial director, which he held from 1962 to 1994.

Only in the 1950s did Liberman take up painting and, later, metal sculpture. His highly recognizable sculptures are assembled from industrial objects (segments of steel I-beams, pipes, drums, and such), often painted in uniform bright colors. In a 1986 interview concerning his formative years as a sculptor and his aesthetic, Liberman said, "I think many works of art are screams, and I identify with screams." His massive work The Way, a  x  x  structure, is made of eighteen salvaged steel oil tanks, and became a signature piece of Laumeier Sculpture Park, and a major landmark of St. Louis, Missouri.

Before finding success in painting and sculpture, Liberman was a photographer. Beginning in 1948, he spent his summers visiting and photographing a generation of modern European artists working in their studios including Georges Braque, Henri Matisse, Maurice Utrillo, Marc Chagall, Marcel Duchamp, Constantin Brancusi, and Pablo Picasso. In 1959 the Museum of Modern Art in New York City exhibited Liberman's photographs of artists and their studios. A year later the images were collected in Liberman's first book, The Artist in his Studio published by Viking Press (Kazanjian and Tomkins, 1993).

He was married briefly to Hildegarde Sturm (August 25, 1936), a model and competitive skier. His second wife (since 1942), Tatiana Yacovleff du Plessix Liberman (1906–1991), had been a childhood playmate and baby sitter. In 1941, they escaped together from occupied France, via Lisbon, to New York. She had operated a hat salon in Paris, then designed hats for Henri Bendel in Manhattan. She continued in millinery at Saks Fifth Avenue where she was billed as "Tatiana du Plessix" or "Tatiana of Saks", until the mid-1950s. In 1992, he married Melinda Pechangco, a nurse who had cared for Tatiana during an early illness. His stepdaughter, Francine du Plessix Gray, was a noted author.

Career
Liberman started his career as a part-time design assistant to graphic artist A. M. Cassandre in Paris for approximately three months in 1930. He started working as a full-time painter in 1936. Then, he served in the French army in the 1940s but was rejected due to ulcers. He began taking photographs in 1949 and sculpting in 1958. Liberman was employed at Vogue magazine from 1941 for 58 years. He was hired by Condé Nast as an assistant to Vogue art director Mehemed Fehmy Agha against Agha's wishes and took over the position a year later. From 1941 to 1962, Liberman succeeded Agha as the magazine's art editor. As part of his work as Vogue art director from 1944 to 1961, he published Lee Miller's photographs of the Buchenwald gas chambers. In 1962, he was promoted to editorial director of all Condé Nast publications, United States and Europe, deputy chairman (editorial) from 1994 to 1999. Throughout his life, Liberman held numerous exhibitions of paintings and sculptures.

Awards
Gold Medal for Design, Exposition Internationale, Paris, 1937
Doctor of Fine Arts: Rhode Island School of Design, Providence, 1980

Publications
La Femme Française dans l'Art, 1936 (in French)
 (editor and designer) The Art and Technique of Color Photography: A Treasury of Color Photographs by the Staff Photographers of Vogue, House & Garden, Glamour, introduction by Aline B. Louchheim, Simon & Schuster (New York), 1951
 The World in Vogue, Compiled by the Viking Press and Vogue; Editors for Viking: Bryan Holme and Katharine Tweed; Editors for Vogue: Jessica Daves and Alexander Liberman, New York : Viking Press, 1963
 The Artist in His Studio, foreword by James Thrall Soby, Viking Press (New York), 1960, revised edition, Random House (New York), 1988
 (photographer) Greece, Gods, and Art, introduction by Robert Graves, commentaries by Iris C. Love, Viking Press (New York), 1968
 Painting and Sculpture, 1950–1970, Garamond/Pridemark Press (Baltimore, Maryland), 1970. By James Pilgrim and Alexander Liberman. Exhibition catalogue for the Corcoran Gallery of Art
Introduction to Vogue Book of Fashion Photography 1919–1979, by Polly Devlin (New York), 1979
 Marlene: An Intimate Photographic Memoir, Random House (New York), 1992
 (photographer) Campidoglio: Michelangelo's Roman Capitol, essay by Joseph Brodsky, Random House (New York), 1994
 (photographer) Then: Photographs, 1925–1995, preface by Calvin Tomkins, selected and designed by Charles Churchward, Random House (New York), 1995

Works
 Prometheus (1964), Anderson Hall (University of Minnesota), Minneapolis, Minnesota
 Ritual II (1966), Lynden Sculpture Garden, Milwaukee, Wisconsin
 Orbits (1967), Lynden Sculpture Garden, Milwaukee, Wisconsin
 Axeltree (1967), Lynden Sculpture Garden, Milwaukee, Wisconsin
 Temple II (1964-1969), The Governor Nelson A. Rockefeller Empire State Plaza Art Collection, Albany, New York
 Contact II (1972), Portland, Oregon
 Gate of Hope (1972), University of Hawaii at Manoa
 Above, Above (1972), Public Art Saint Paul's Western Sculpture Park
 Path (1973), Denison University, Granville, Ohio
 Argo (1974), Milwaukee, Wisconsin
 Phoenix (1974), Los Angeles County Museum of Art, Los Angeles, California
 Covenant (1975), University of Pennsylvania, Philadelphia, Pennsylvania
 Symbol (1978), Rockford, Illinois
 On High (1979), New Haven, Connecticut
 Stargazer (1983), San Diego, California
 Olympic Iliad (1984), Seattle, Washington
 Faith (1984), Jerusalem, Israel
 Galaxy (1985), Leadership Square, Oklahoma City, Oklahoma
 Trope I (1986), Norfolk, Virginia
 Abracadabra (1992), Pyramid Hill Sculpture Park and Museum, Hamilton, Ohio.
 Archway (1997), Museum SAN, Wonju, South Korea
 The Way (1980), Laumeier Sculpture Park, Greater St. Louis, Missouri
 Thrust (1980), Stamford, Connecticut

Collections

Liberman's work is held in the following collections:
Metropolitan Museum of Art
Storm King Art Center
Hirshhorn Museum and Sculpture Garden
Pyramid Hill Sculpture Park and Museum
Tate Gallery
Guggenheim Museum

Sources

References

External links

http://artscenecal.com/ArtistsFiles/LibermanA/LiebermanAFile/ALiberman0302.html

http://the-artists.org/artist/Alexander-Liberman
Art Directors Club biography and portrait
Union List of Artist Names, Getty Vocabularies. ULAN Full Record Display for Alexander Liberman, Getty Vocabulary Program. Getty Research Institute, Los Angeles, California
Alexander Liberman photography archive, ca. 1925-ca. 1998. Research Library at the Getty Research Institute. Los Angeles, California.

1912 births
1999 deaths
20th-century Russian sculptors
20th-century American male artists
Russian male sculptors
Russian painters
Russian male painters
20th-century American painters
American male painters
Photographers from Florida
French emigrants to the United States
American people of Russian-Jewish descent
Photography in Greece
Ukrainian Jews
Jewish sculptors
20th-century American sculptors
American male sculptors
Ukrainian male sculptors
Ukrainian sculptors
Emigrants from the Russian Empire to France
White Russian emigrants to the United States
White Russian emigrants to France
Sculptors from Florida
École Spéciale d'Architecture alumni
20th-century Russian male artists